Ypsolopha japonica is a moth of the family Ypsolophidae. It is known from Japan, Korea, China and Russia.

The wingspan is about 25 mm.

References

Ypsolophidae
Moths of Asia